The RA-2 Multiple Unit  (Cyrillic:РА2) is a Russian diesel multiple unit (rail bus), type 2. The RA-2 is produced by Metrovagonmash and is designed for passenger transportation on non-electrified railway lines with high traffic, as well as suburban and inter-regional communication. They can be operated as a part of only two head end cars, and with one or two trailing cars. The head / end cars have one exit from the cab for high platforms, and one in the centre of the car high and low platforms.

Gallery

See also
 The Museum of the Moscow Railway
DT1

References

External links
 - JSC "Spetsremont" factory (Russian)
  - JSC "Spetsremont" factory (Russian)

Diesel multiple units of Russia
Diesel multiple units of Ukraine